Portugal was represented by Carlos Mendes, with the song "Verão", at the 1968 Eurovision Song Contest, which took place on 6 April in London. "Verão" was chosen as the Portuguese entry at the Grande Prémio TV da Canção Portuguesa on 4 March.

Before Eurovision

Festival da Canção 1968
The Grande Prémio TV da Canção Portuguesa 1968 was held at the Lumiar studios of the Radio and Television of Portugal in Lisbon, hosted by Maria Fernanda and Henrique Mendes. Unlike the previous year, no semi-finals where held, returning to the single-night model. Ten songs took part in the final. During the interpretation of her second theme, Simone de Oliveira felt sick and was unable to complete it, being removed from the stage to receive medical attention. Joaquim Luís Gomes conducted all the songs. The results were determined by a distrital jury, composed of three members which each had 5 votes to be distributed among the songs it intended to award, making a total of 15 votes per district.

At Eurovision 
On the night of the final Mendes performed 1st in the running order, preceding Netherlands. At the close of the voting the song had received 5 points, coming 11th in the field of 17 competing countries. The orchestra during the Portuguese entry was conducted by Joaqium Luis Gomes.

The national jury which awarded the points from Portugal comprised Maria Helena Oliveira Simões (housewife), Madalena Iglésias (singer), Maria João Aguiar (TV and radio presenter), Isabel Maria Spencer Vieira Martins (college student), António Reis (publishing director), José Joaquim Machado Leite (office secretary), António Moniz Pereira (member of the group Quarteto 1111), Bernardo Manuel Palma Mira Delgado (mechanical engineer), Luís Fernando Cardoso Nandim de Carvalho (university student), and Pedro Manuel Mota Vaz do Castelo (radio presenter).

Voting

References 

1968
Countries in the Eurovision Song Contest 1968
Eurovision